For information on all Marist College sports, see Marist Red Foxes

The Marist Red Foxes football program is the intercollegiate American football team for Marist College located in the U.S. state of New York. The team competes in the NCAA Division I Football Championship Subdivision (FCS) and are members of the Pioneer Football League. Marist's first football team was fielded in 1978. The team plays its home games at the 5,000 seat Tenney Stadium at Leonidoff Field in Poughkeepsie, New York. The Red Foxes are coached by Jim Parady.

History

Marist College Football traces its roots back to 1965, when the first team, then a club, posted a 3–3 record under coach Ron Levine.  The program would soon become one of the most powerful club programs in the country advancing to two National Title Games (1970 and 1972) while competing in the Eastern Collegiate Club Football League.  After 13 seasons of numerous All-America selections and conference crowns, the program was elevated to varsity status in 1978 at the Division III level.  The first varsity win was a 14–9 decision over Manhattan College in 1978.  The Red Foxes played at the Division III level for the next 15 years, as members of the Metropolitan Conference, the ACFC, and the Liberty Conference.  Mike Malet was the first coach of the varsity Red Foxes, holding that position from 1978–88.
 
In 1993, the football program moved up to Division I-AA and in 1994 became the first Marist athletic team to become a member of the Metro Atlantic Athletic Conference.

The Red Foxes broke into the national spotlight in 1997 by setting national records. The Marist defense set a pair of I-AA records in the fall of 1997, breaking the opponent rushing yards per game and fewest yards allowed per rush marks, that had been held by Florida A&M University. The Red Foxes allowed just 39.8 rush yards a game, eclipsing the 1978 record of 45.4 yards per game. The stingy Marist defense also allowed just 1.2 yards per rush, which snapped the Rattlers 1984 national record of 1.3 yards a carry.

The 1998 campaign saw Marist again ranking among the best in the nation defensively. The Red Foxes ranked second in the nation in pass efficiency at 78.3, and total defense, allowing just 219.6 yards per game. Marist also ranked third in the nation in rushing defense at 73.8 yards per game, and was the sixth-best in the country in points allowed, giving up just 12.9 a game. The offense rewrote 15 school records, six on the legs of the school's all-time single-season touchdown leader (21), the late J.J. Allen.

During 2000 Marist won its 100th game in its 23rd year of varsity competition in a 34–31 win over Wagner College. Marist had a then-program-record 11 athletes named to the All-MAAC teams at the end of the season, and had seven players named All-America recognition from the Football Gazette. It was the Red Foxes' seventh straight winning season.

The team's home, Leonidoff Field, was renovated after the 2006 season and beautiful Tenney Stadium was built around it.  Marist played its first post-renovation game there on October 6, 2007 against Duquesne.

In 2008, after the MAAC football conference disbanded, the team joined the Pioneer Football League.

In their first season as a member of the Pioneer Football League (2008), Marist tied a then program record with seven victories, and set a program record with a six-game winning streak. They finished the season 7–4.

In 2010, the Red Foxes set a single-season program record with 2,950 yards through the air. Quarterback Tommy Reilly set the then program's single-game and single-season records for completions, attempts and passing yards.

The 2013 team claimed a share the PFL title, finished 7–1 in PFL play and set a program record for victories; ending the season 8–3 overall. A controversial league tiebreaker gave the PFL's FCS playoff auto-bid to Butler.

Conference affiliations

Classifications
1965–1977: NCAA College Division
1978–1992: NCAA Division III
1993–present: NCAA Division I–AA/FCS

Conference memberships
1965–1977: Independent
1978: Division III Independent
1979–1984: Met-Intercollegiate Conference
1985–1988: Division III Independent
1989–1991: Atlantic Collegiate Football Conference
1992: Liberty Football Conference
1993: Division I–AA Independent
1994–2007: Metro Atlantic Athletic Conference
2008: Division I–AA Independent
2009–present: Pioneer Football League

Individual single season records

Notable former players

Notable alumni include:

Jovan Rhodes (RB, 1994–1998) – Finished his career with 3,156 rushing yards, a I-AA record at the time.
Terrence Fede (DL, 2009–2014) – Drafted #234 overall by the Miami Dolphins, first player drafted in school history. On December 21, 2014, Fede blocked a punt forcing a safety to win the game against the Minnesota Vikings.
Jason Myers (K, 2009–2012) – Signed as undrafted free agent by the Jacksonville Jaguars on March 3, 2015. Currently the starting kicker for the Seattle Seahawks. Made the 2019 Pro Bowl, and the 2022 Pro Bowl.

Head coaches

Jim Parady (1992–present)
Rick Pardy (1989–1991) – Record: 18–11–2 (.613)
Mike Malet (1978–1988) – Record: 31–71–0 (.304)

Year-by-year results

Championships

Conference championships

Bowl games

Future non-conference opponents 
Announced schedules as of December 12, 2022.

References

External links

 

 
American football teams established in 1965
1965 establishments in New York (state)